Donald Greenwell (4 January 1924 – December 2002) was an English professional footballer who played as a half-back in the Football League for York City.

References

1924 births
2002 deaths
Sportspeople from Chester-le-Street
Footballers from County Durham
English footballers
Association football midfielders
York City F.C. players
English Football League players